Hermann Otto Ludwig Weingärtner (27 August 1864 – 22 December 1919) was a German gymnast.

He started his career in his hometown Frankfurt (Oder) at the local gymnastics club Frankfurter Turnverein 1860. Later on he moved to Berlin to compete for the Deutsche Turnerschaft.

He competed at the 1896 Summer Olympics in Athens. Weingärtner was a member of the German team that won two gold medals by placing first in both of the team events, the parallel bars and the horizontal bar.

He also won a number of individual medals, taking the gold in the horizontal bar, silver in pommel horse and rings, and bronze in the vault.  He competed in the parallel bars, but did not win a medal in that event.  His six medals made him one of the most successful competitors at the first modern Olympic Games.

After his return to Germany he and most of the other German gymnasts were suspended, because the Deutsche Turnerschaft (at this time the governing body of German gymnastics) boycotted the Olympic games with the reason that competing is "un-German". So he moved back to Frankfurt (Oder) to manage the open-air swimming pool founded by his father on the Ziegenwerder island.

He drowned trying to rescue a person from drowning in the Oder.

In 1996, the main footpath on the Ziegenwerder island was named Hermann-Weingärtner-Weg.

See also
List of multiple Olympic medalists at a single Games

References

External links
 Hermann Weingärtner Olympic medals and stats

1864 births
1919 deaths
Sportspeople from Frankfurt (Oder)
German male artistic gymnasts
Olympic gymnasts of Germany
Gymnasts at the 1896 Summer Olympics
19th-century sportsmen
Olympic gold medalists for Germany
Olympic silver medalists for Germany
Olympic bronze medalists for Germany
Olympic medalists in gymnastics
Medalists at the 1896 Summer Olympics
Deaths by drowning
Accidental deaths in Germany
19th-century German people
20th-century German people